Smith Grove is a rural unincorporated community in Houston County, Texas It is located about 4 miles east of Lovelady at the intersection of FM's 1280 and 1309.

References

Unincorporated communities in Houston County, Texas
Unincorporated communities in Texas